Two or Three Things I Know About Her is a 1967 French New Wave film written and directed by Jean-Luc Godard, one of three features he completed that year. As with the other two (La Chinoise and Weekend), it is considered both socially and stylistically radical. Village Voice critic Amy Taubin considers the film to be among the greatest achievements in filmmaking.

Description
The film does not tell a story so much as present an essay-like study of Godard's view of contemporary life; Godard wrote that "I wanted to include everything: sports, politics, even groceries. Everything should be put in a film." Godard narrates the film in a whispered voiceover in which he discusses his fears about the contemporary world, including those related to the Vietnam War. The film frequently cuts to various still shots of bright consumer products and ongoing construction.

As with many of Godard's works, the film does not follow the narrative arc of conventional cinema with an introduction, conflict and resolution. Instead, it presents 24 hours in the sophisticated but empty life of Juliette Jeanson, a seemingly bourgeois married mother and prostitute. Juliette begins her day by dropping her screaming child off with a man who provides care for the children of prostitutes. Her uneventful daily routine of shopping, housework and child-rearing is interspersed with client encounters. All of the film's sexual interplay is banal rather than erotic, and one client, an American wearing a shirt with his country's flag, demands that the women whom he has hired wear airline shopping bags over their heads.

Although the film had a script, the cast often breaks the fourth wall, looking into the camera and delivering seemingly random monologues about life and themselves. Vlady and other actors wore earpieces through which Godard asked surprise questions, often catching her off-guard because she was required to give spontaneous answers that were appropriate to her character.

The film features Beethoven's String Quartet No. 16 in F major, Op. 135.

Cast
 Marina Vlady as Juliette Jeanson 
 Roger Montsoret as Robert Jeanson 
 Anny Duperey as Marianne 
 Raoul Lévy as John Bogus, the American 
 Jean Narboni as Roger 
 Juliet Berto as girl talking to Robert 
 Christophe Bourseiller as Christophe Jeanson 
 Marie Bourseiller as Solange Jeanson

Background
Godard began production in the summer of 1966. Shortly afterward, he was approached by producer Georges de Beauregard to quickly make a film to offset a financial shortfall incurred after Jacques Rivette's film The Nun (1966) was banned by the French government. Godard agreed and began production on Made in U.S.A (1966), his last film with Anna Karina. Godard would shoot Two or Three Things I Know About Her in the morning and Made in U.S.A in the afternoon simultaneously each day for one month.

The film was first inspired by an article by Catherine Vimenet in Le Nouvel Observateur about prostitution in the suburbs, titled "Les étoiles filantes" ("The Shooting Stars"). Godard stated that during the film he wanted "to include everything: sports, politics, even groceries" and that the film was "... a continuation of the movement begun by Resnais in Muriel: an attempt at description of a phenomenon known in mathematics and sociology as a 'complex'." The film's most famous shot is a lengthy close-up of a cup of coffee. In an essay, Godard stated that "... basically what I am doing is making the spectator share the arbitrary nature of my choices, and the quest for general rules which might justify a particular choice." He added, "I watch myself filming, and you hear me thinking aloud. In other words, it isn't a film, it's an attempt at a film and presented as such."

Themes
Juliette lives in one of many luxurious high-rises being erected in the banlieues (suburbs) of Paris. Though the structures were meant to provide housing to families working in the growing capital during the prosperous post-war years, Godard sees the banlieues as the infrastructure for promoting a value system based on consumerism, a term he equates with prostitution itself. Godard argued that a consumerist society demands a workforce living in regimented time and space, forced to work jobs they don't like, "a prostitution of the mind."

On 25 October 1966, Godard appeared on the television program Zoom to debate with government official Jean St. Geours, who had predicted that advertising would increase, as the basic impulse of the French society at the time was to increase its standard of living. Godard explained that he saw advertisers as the pimps who enslave women to the point at which they give their bodies without compunction, because they have been convinced that what they can buy has more potential to bring happiness than does the loving enjoyment of sex.

As with many of Godard's films from the mid-1960s onward, Two or Three Things I Know About Her demonstrates his growing disenchantment with the United States. This contrasts with his earlier French New Wave films such as Breathless (1960) that make admiring references to American cinema and actors.

Title
A promotional poster for the film offered different meanings for the "her" of the title, each one a French feminine noun:

 HER, the cruelty of neo-capitalism
 HER, prostitution
 HER, the Paris region
 HER, the bathroom that 70% of the French don't have
 HER, the terrible law of huge building complexes
 HER, the physical side of love
 HER, the life of today
 HER, the war in Vietnam
 HER, the modern call-girl
 HER, the death of modern beauty
 HER, the circulation of ideas
 HER, the gestapo of structures.

Reception
On Rotten Tomatoes, the film holds an approval rating of 94% based on 32 reviews, with an average rating of 8.1/10. The website's critics consensus reads, "Two or Three Things I Know About Her marks a turning point in Godard's filmography – one that may confound more narratively dependent audiences, but rewards repeated viewings."

Awards
Two or Three Things I Know About Her won the Prix Marilyn Monroe in 1967 from a jury that included Marguerite Duras and Florence Malraux.

Many regard the film as being among Godard's most significant works. It received 19 top-10 votes (16 from critics and three from directors) in the 2012 Sight & Sound poll of the greatest films ever made.

American re-release
The film was re-released in CinemaScope on 17 November 2006 for a two-week run at Film Forum in New York City.

See also
 Apartment Wife: Affair In the Afternoon

References

External links
 
 
 2 or 3 Things I Know About Her: The Whole and Its Parts – an essay by Amy Taubin at The Criterion Collection

Bibliography

 
 
 

1967 films
1967 comedy-drama films
1960s avant-garde and experimental films
1960s French films
1960s French-language films
Films about prostitution in Paris
Films based on newspaper and magazine articles
Films directed by Jean-Luc Godard
Films produced by Anatole Dauman
Films shot in Paris
French avant-garde and experimental films
French comedy-drama films